The Oddaverjar were a powerful family clan in the medieval Icelandic Commonwealth. Their ascendancy was during the second half of the 12th century, but their power subsequently waned. They play only a minor role in the Icelandic civil war during the Age of the Sturlungs. Only after the signing of the Gamli sáttmáli ("Old Covenant") did they oppose the influence of Gissur Þorvaldsson, Earl of Iceland.

The Oddverjar traced their roots to the first Icelandic settlers. The first known Oddaverji was Sæmundur Sigfússon fróði ("Sæmundur The Knowledgeable"), an early 12th century scholar.

References

Further reading
 Árni Daníel Júlíusson, Jón Ólafur Ísberg, Helgi Skúli Kjartansson Íslenskur sögu atlas: 1. bindi: Frá öndverðu til 18. aldar Almenna bókafélagið, Reykjavík 1989

Icelandic family clans